Alan Murray (born 5 December 1949) is an English former football player, coach and manager.

Biography 
Born in Newcastle upon Tyne, Murray spent the first years of his playing career at Middlesbrough, gradually honing his coaching skills as he struggled to break into the first team. He later moved on to York City, Brentford and Doncaster Rovers before finishing his playing career at Frickley Athletic.

His coaching skills were put to the test at Hartlepool United in 1991 when, with boss Cyril Knowles battling against a brain tumour that was to eventually prove fatal, Murray was shuffled from his chief executive role to the position of manager. A 17-month stint at Darlington followed where he gradually pulled the team away from the foot of the Football League before he teamed up with former teammate Graeme Souness at Southampton.

In September 2004 he once again joined Souness this time at Newcastle United as assistant manager.

Managerial stats

References

External links

Alan Murray at Post War English & Scottish Football League A - Z Player's Transfer Database

1949 births
Living people
Footballers from Newcastle upon Tyne
Association football midfielders
Middlesbrough F.C. players
York City F.C. players
Brentford F.C. players
Doncaster Rovers F.C. players
Frickley Athletic F.C. players
Hartlepool United F.C. managers
S.L. Benfica B managers
Liga Portugal 2 managers
English footballers
English football managers
Darlington F.C. managers
Blackburn Rovers F.C. non-playing staff
Newcastle United F.C. non-playing staff
Southampton F.C. non-playing staff
Hartlepool United F.C. non-playing staff
English expatriate football managers
Expatriate football managers in Portugal
English expatriate sportspeople in Portugal